Once Upon a Love is a Taiwanese idol romance drama television series written by Yang Yi Xun、Jing Ru and Hui Fen and is directed by Lin Qing Zhen. It stars Sunny Wang, Matt Wu, Cheryl Yang and Reen Yu . The show was aired on GTV on 8 July 2012.

Synopsis
A decade ago when Li Jin Yang/John Lee (Sunny Wang) was still a high school student, because of what Tian Ru Mi (Cheryl Yang) said - who was then the crowned "Rose Princess", inspired him to become a fashion designer. Ten years later, Li Jin Yang finally became a fashion designer in the United States and after being awarded a prestigious award known as the "Best Women's Outfit Designer" award, both his career and love life was perfect. However, things did not turn out as good for Ru Mi who once won the "Rose Princess Pageant" is now a tour guide and also a single mother with an eleven-year-old son. After being forced to move out of her house in Taipei and the closure of the travel agency she was working for, Ru Mi lost both her source of income and house, not knowing when her next meal will be.

After receiving a phone call, Jin Yang was informed that his grandmother (Mei Fang) was sick and wanted to bring his girlfriend Rebecca (Katherine Wang) back to Taiwan with him to meet his family. However, Rebecca refused and in the end Li Jin Yang had no choice but to leave for Taiwan by himself. Under the encouragement of her friend and her future colleague, Gu Li (Ying Wei Min), Ru Mi returned to her hometown-Zhang Hua and started a small travel agency business with a small bus known as "Sweet Bus". After Jin Yang unknowingly helped Ru Mi to complete a new design template for the bus's exterior that was drawn by her son, Tian Yi Xiang, Jin Yang and Ru Mi meet again after ten years.

When Jin Yang found out that his grandmother had pretended to be ill to trick him into returning to Taiwan, he was furious and wanted to return to the United States. However, Jin Yang was unable to go against his grandmother's words, he had no choice but to accept his grandmother's request to go on a blind date with a rich daughter of the local winery owner. However, Jin Yang is starting to fall in love with Ru Mi again and Ru Mi, who believes that she would one day find Yi Xiang's father again, gets disappointed again and again starts to open her heart to Jin Yang. Jin Yang then becomes Yi Xiang's godfather after knowing that Yi Xiang longs to have a father because he never met his own father before. However, when Yi Xiang's father, Xu Ye, appears at the same time, who will Ru Mi choose, Xu Ye or Jin Yang?

Cast

Main cast

Supporting cast

Cameo

Soundtrack

Opening Theme
"擁抱你的微笑" (Embracing Your Smile)
Performed by Claire Kuo
Lyrics: Wang Ya Jun (王雅君)
Composer: Ji Jia Song (紀佳松)

Ending Theme
"看見" (See)
Performed by Wang Hong En (王宏恩)
Lyrics: Wang Hong En (王宏恩)
Composer: Wang Hong En (王宏恩)

Insert songs
"再見面的時候" (Moment We Meet Again)
Performed by Huang Ya Li (黄雅莉)
Lyrics: Yao Ruo Long (姚若龍)
Composer: Chen Xiao Xia (陳小霞)
  
"打勾勾" (Pinky Promise)
Performed by Chen Hui Yi (陳暉宜)
Lyrics: Tian Yue (天樂)
Composer: Chen Hui Yi (陳暉宜)

"幸福說" (Happiness Said)
Performed by Shirley (戴蕙心)
Lyrics: Chen Xue Sheng (陳學聖)
Composer: Shirley (戴蕙心)

"Miss you"
Performed by Shirley (戴蕙心)
Lyrics: Shirley (戴蕙心)
Composer: Shirley (戴蕙心)

"星星" (Stars)
Performed by Jingwen (曾靜玟)
Lyrics: Wang Ya Jun (王雅君)
Composer: Wang Ya Jun (王雅君)

Broadcast

Reception

References

External links
 GTV official homepage 
 FTV official homepage 

Gala Television original programming
Formosa Television original programming
2012 Taiwanese television series debuts
2012 Taiwanese television series endings